Edwin Alcibiades Ávila Vanegas (born 21 November 1989 in Cali) is a Colombian road and track cyclist, who currently rides for UCI ProTeam . At the 2012 Summer Olympics, he competed in the Men's team pursuit for the national team. He won the Colombian National Road Race Championships in 2016.

Major results

Track

2007
 3rd  Madison (with Jaime Ramirez Bernal), UCI Junior World Championships
2008
 3rd  Team pursuit (Cali), UCI World Cup
2010
 Central American and Caribbean Games
1st  Team pursuit
2nd  Individual pursuit
 2nd  Team pursuit (Cali), UCI World Cup
2011
 1st  Points race, UCI World Championships
 1st  Points race, UCI World Ranking
 1st  Team pursuit, Pan American Games
 3rd  Points race (Cali), UCI World Cup
2012
 1st  Team pursuit (Cali), UCI World Cup
2014
 1st  Points race, UCI World Championships

Road racing

2010
 1st Circuito Feria de Manizales
 5th Road race, Central American and Caribbean Games
2012
 1st  Overall Tour of Trinidad and Tobago
 1st  Sprints classification Tour de San Luis
2014
 7th Grand Prix de Denain
2015
 10th Route Adélie
2016
 1st  Road race, National Road Championships
2017
 Tour d'Azerbaïdjan
1st  Points classification
1st Stage 4
 1st Stage 1 Sibiu Tour
 2nd Overall Tour de Taiwan
1st  Points classification
1st Stages 1 & 4 
 2nd Overall Tour de Korea
1st  Points classification
 5th Winston-Salem Cycling Classic
2018
 4th Overall Tour de Taiwan
1st  Points classification
1st Stage 3
2019
 1st  Overall GP Beiras e Serra da Estrela
1st Stage 1
 1st Stage 4 Tour du Rwanda
 4th Grand Prix de Fourmies
 8th Coppa Bernocchi
2020
 9th Overall Bałtyk–Karkonosze Tour

Grand Tour general classification results timeline

References

External links

Colombian male cyclists
Living people
Olympic cyclists of Colombia
Cyclists at the 2012 Summer Olympics
1989 births
Sportspeople from Cali
UCI Track Cycling World Champions (men)
Pan American Games gold medalists for Colombia
Cyclists at the 2011 Pan American Games
Pan American Games medalists in cycling
Central American and Caribbean Games gold medalists for Colombia
Colombian track cyclists
South American Games gold medalists for Colombia
South American Games silver medalists for Colombia
South American Games medalists in cycling
Competitors at the 2010 South American Games
Competitors at the 2010 Central American and Caribbean Games
Central American and Caribbean Games medalists in cycling
Medalists at the 2011 Pan American Games
21st-century Colombian people
Competitors at the 2018 Central American and Caribbean Games